Ivan Semyonovich Kozlovsky (also referred to as Kozlovskiy or Kozlovskij; 21 December 1993) was a Soviet lyric tenor and one of the most well known stars of Russian opera, as well a producer and director of his own opera company, and longtime teacher at the Moscow Conservatory. People's Artist of the USSR (1940) and Hero of Socialist Labour (1980).

Biography

Ivan Kozlovsky was born in the village of Marianivka near Bila Tserkva, the Kiev Governorate, the Russian Empire (now in Ukraine), and began to sing at the age of seven in the choir of the St. Michael's Golden-Domed Monastery. He went on to study drama, piano and singing (with the famous soprano Olena Muravyova) at the Kyiv National I. K. Karpenko-Kary Theatre, Cinema and Television University. He also sang with his brother in Alexander Koshetz's choir in Kyiv. This instruction was cut short after two years, due to the outbreak of the civil war in the aftermath of the Russian Revolution. Kozlovsky sang in a vocal quartet under the direction of O. Sveshnikov. His voice enabled him to join the army engineers, as a lead singer in a military band.

He made his operatic début in 1920 as Faust at the Poltava theatre, where he sang until 1923. He followed this with engagements at the Kharkiv opera in 1923-4, and the Yekaterinburg (then called Sverdlovsk) opera theatre in 1924-6, before becoming one of the leading tenors at the Bolshoi Theatre in Moscow from 1926 to 1954. He had a memorable audition at the Bolshoi in 1924, reportedly reaching the highest notes of the register with ease (throughout his career, he developed a reputation for singing the highest note possible and hanging onto it for the added adulation). At the Bolshoi, he came under the mentorship of Leonid Sobinov, the leading Russian tenor at the time. Kozlovsky went on to sing in over 50 operas as the leading tenor of the Bolshoi.

In 1938, Kozlovsky organized and directed a concert ensemble of opera singers, VTO Soviet Opera Ensemble, directing himself in Werther by Massenet and Orfeo ed Euridice by Gluck, among other productions. He was awarded the prestigious designation of People's Artist of the USSR in 1940.

Kozlovsky was well known to be a favorite singer of Joseph Stalin. Kozlovsky gained great renown throughout the Soviet Union, but was never allowed to leave its borders.

Kozlovsky had a friendly rivalry with Sergei Lemeshev, another opera singer immensely popular in Russia. They both often sang the same roles, and Russian opera lovers were divided into supporters of one or the other. The theatre lobby was a venue for scuffles between fans jokingly called the "lemeshistki" and the "kozlovityanki".

Kozlovsky married the popular actress Alexandra Herzig (1886–1964), who was 14 years older than he and much better known, causing the public to refer to him as "Herzig's husband". Later, when he attained greater fame, Herzig became known as "Kozlovsky’s wife". After his first marriage ended in divorce, Kozlovsky remarried, this time to an actress 14 years younger than he, Galina Sergeyeva. Sergeyeva played the female lead in the films Pyshka (Пышкa) ("Boule de Suif," 1934), Lyubov Alyony (Любoвь Aлёны) ("Alyona’s Love", 1934), and Vesennie dni (Весенние дни) ("Spring Days", 1934). Although she bore him two daughters, the marriage with Kozlovsky did not last long.

Kozlovsky and solo performances 

Kozlovsky gave many concerts throughout the Soviet Union, singing Russian and Ukrainian songs and romances, as well as German lieder by Schubert, Schumann, and Liszt. He taught singing at the Moscow Conservatory from 1956 to 1980. After 1954, Kozlovsky continued to appear occasionally at the Bolshoi, giving his final appearance in 1970 in the role of Yurodivy (the Simpleton) in Boris Godunov. He continued to appear frequently in public and even sang on 4 July 1985 at Mark Reizen's 90th birthday at the Bolshoi. The last concert given by Kozlovsky took place in 1989 at the Central House of Writers in Moscow. He died in Moscow at the age of 93.

Kozlovsky and Ukrainian music 

Kozlovsky throughout his life was an active proponent of Ukrainian music, and performed works by Ukrainian composers such as Mykola Lysenko, Yakiv Stepovy, Kyrylo Stetsenko, and Mykola Arkas. In 1924, he sang the role of Yontek in Moniuszko's "Halka" in Ukrainian. In 1940, he directed the first performance of the Ukrainian opera Kateryna by Mykola Arkas, and in 1954 Mykola Lysenko's Natalka Poltavka. In 1970, he funded the construction of a music school in his home village of Marianivka. He recorded 22 records of Ukrainian folk songs, romances and arias in Ukrainian. Kozlovsky was also the author of numerous Memoirs about Ukrainian singers O. Petrusevych, Mykhailo Donets, M. Mykysh, Borys Hmyria and others.

Legacy 

Kozlovsky sang more than 50 operatic roles, and was especially famous as Lensky in Eugene Onegin, Berendey in The Snow Maiden, Levko in May Night, the Indian Guest in Sadko, Vladimir in Prince Igor, Nero in the opera by Rubinstein, Dubrovsky in the opera by Napravnik, and so on. He also was outstanding in the western repertoire: Faust (Gounod), Werther, Rigoletto, The Barber of Seville, Lohengrin, Orfeo ed Euridice, La traviata, La bohème, and so on.

In September 1993, the belt asteroid 4944 Kozlovskij was named in honor of Ivan Kozlovsky's career; his famous rival Sergey Lemeshev received the same honor with asteroid 4561 Lemeshev upon his death in 1978.

Quotations 

"They say that Ivan Kozlovsky considered his voice as his one and only possession and prayed every morning thanking the Lord for the priceless gift He gave him..." (Olga Fyodorova, Music portraits, see the link below)

"Lemeshev is a far more lyric and tender Gherman than those to whom we’ve become accustomed. He and Kozlovsky were long-time rivals; each sings Lensky’s aria, with quite different emphases." (Stefan Zucker)

"31 October 2005, 17:31. Monument to known Ukrainian singer Ivan Kozlovsky to be erected in Kyiv. This decision was made by Kyiv City Hall. It was decided that Pechersk district state administration is to erect the monument at its expense." (From the official news)

Discography 
 The Great Russian Tenor - Ivan Kozlovsky: Pearl GEM0221, Released 7 February 2005 ADD
 Russian Opera at the Bolshoi: The Vintage Years: DVD Region 1 (playable worldwide) #FD2019, Russian, English subtitles. 112m. B& W/Color, Dolby Digital audio.
 Tchaikovsky, Eugene Onegin Aleksandr Ivanovich Orlov: Melodiya D 0253/60 (1952), D 09377/82(1962), Chant du Monde LDX 8088/90, Bruno 23001/3, Colosseum CRLP 10270, 80 and 90
 Mussorgsky, Boris Godunov, Melodiya D 0305/12 (1952), D 05836/43 (1959); Ultraphone 159/62; Bruno 23025/7; Colosseum 124/6; Period SPLP 554 (1952), 1033
Also this link

See also 
 Russian opera

Notes

References 
 

In English:
 (1992). Guide de L'Opéra, Fayard. (page 427)
 Ardoin, John (1995). "Ivan Kozlovsky, A Voice from Behind the Curtain", in Opera Quarterly 11. (pages 95–102)

In Russian:
 Kuznetsova, A. (Кузнецова, А.) (1964). People's Artist (Народный артист), Art.
 Sletov, V. (Слетов, В.) (1945). I. Kozlovsky (И. Козловский), Art.
 Polianovsky, H. (Поляновский, Г.) (1945). Ivan Semyonovitch Kozlovsky (Иван Семёнович Козловский), Art.
 Hroshyeva, E. (Грошева, Е.) (1960). 40 Years on the Stage of the Opera (Сорок лет на оперной сцене), Soviet Music.

In Ukrainian:
 Bulat, T. (Булат, Т.) (1980). Ukrainian Folk Songs and Romances in the Repertoire of I.S. Kozlovsky (Українські народні пісні та романси в репертуарі І.С.Козловського), Folk Works and Ethnography (Народна творчість та етнографія) No. 3.
 Lysenko, I. A dictionary of Ukrainian singers - Словник Співаків України - Kyiv, 1997

External links
 Music Portraits
 Russia in US
 Opera Vivrà
 Archive Music
 The Rivals
 
  Biography in English
 Biography in Russian
 CD review
 The family matters 1
 The family matters 2
 On Alexandra Herzig, from Ukrainian Wikipedia
 On Galina Sergeyeva
 History of the Tenor - Sound Clips and Narration

1900 births
1993 deaths
Soviet male opera singers
People from Kyiv Oblast
Heroes of Socialist Labour
Honored Artists of the RSFSR
People's Artists of the USSR
Stalin Prize winners
Recipients of the Order of Lenin
Recipients of the Shevchenko National Prize
Recipients of the title of People's Artists of Ukraine
Russian opera directors
Soviet tenors
20th-century Ukrainian male opera singers
Ukrainian operatic tenors
Burials at Novodevichy Cemetery